Chah Kandeh (also Romanized as Chāh Kandeh and Chāhkandeh) is a village in Kuhestan Rural District, Rostaq District, Darab County, Fars Province, Iran. At the 2006 census, its population was 21, in 8 families.

References 

Populated places in Darab County